There are at least eight members of the dwarf-mistletoe and sandalwood order, Santalales, found in Montana.  Some of these species are exotics (not native to Montana) and some species have been designated as Species of Concern.

Dwarf-mistletoes
Family: Viscaceae
Arceuthobium americanum, American dwarf-mistletoe
Arceuthobium campylopodum, western dwarf-mistletoe
Arceuthobium cyanocarpum, limber pine dwarf-mistletoe
Arceuthobium douglasii, Douglas-fir dwarf-mistletoe
Arceuthobium laricis, larch dwarf-mistletoe

Sandalwood
Family: Santalaceae
Comandra umbellata, bastard toadflax
Geocaulon lividum, northern bastard-toadflax
Thesium arvense, thesium

Further reading

See also
 List of dicotyledons of Montana

Notes

Montana
Montana